Marx Returns is the debut novel by the British writer and filmmaker Jason Barker. It tells the story of the German philosopher Karl Marx and his struggle to complete his magnum opus Capital.

Reception
Reviewing Marx Returns in the Los Angeles Review of Books, Nina Power described it as "an imaginative, uplifting, and sometimes disturbing alternative history". Writing for The Australian, Peter Beilharz declared that "The story that Barker tells is incredibly witty, clever, and creative. It is amusing and entertaining as well as instructive."

Barker discussed his novel at the British Library’s Karl Marx bicentennial event on 5 May 2018. Other invited speakers were Clive Coleman and Richard Bean, writers of the 2017 West End play Young Marx, along with "the team behind Raoul Peck’s film The Young Karl Marx". The event was moderated by Eleanor Marx biographer Rachel Holmes.

In an interview with Marx200, a German commemorative website set up by the Rosa Luxemburg Foundation, Barker observes that "Marx Returns is not a philosophical novel" and is "an adventure story."

References

External links
 (2019 snapshot from the Internet Archive Wayback Machine)

2018 British novels
Works about Karl Marx
Zero Books
2018 debut novels